Hedman is a Swedish surname. It is an ornamental name composed of the elements hed "heath", "moor" + man "man".

In 2014, the surname was most frequently found in Sweden, followed by the United States and Finland.

Notable people with the surname include:

 Al Hedman (born 1953), former Jamaican-born English professional darts player
 Anton Hedman (born 1986), Swedish ice hockey player
 Deta Hedman (born 1959), English darts player
 Drew Hedman (born 1986), American baseball coach
 Graham Hedman (born 1979), British short-distance runner
 Gustaf Erik Hedman (1777–1841), Finnish master painter
 Heikki Hedman (1940–2022), Finnish tennis player
 Magnus Hedman (born 1973), Swedish footballer
 Marina Hedman (born 1944), retired Swedish pornographic actress
 Martha Hedman (1883–1974), Swedish-American actress
 Mika Hedman (born 1965), Finnish former professional tennis player
 Oscar Hedman (born 1986), Swedish ice hockey player
 Per Erik Hedman (born 1959), Swedish comic book writer
 Reidar Hedman (1896–1961), Finnish educator, eugenist, and politician
 Rudi Hedman (born 1964), English retired professional footballer
 Sigrid Hedman (1855–1922), Swedish spiritist
 Ture Hedman (1895–1950), Swedish gymnast
 Victor Hedman (born 1990), Swedish hockey player

See also 
 Hedmanska gården – cultural monument in Malmö
 Rosenvingeska huset   – cultural monument in Malmö
 Beijerska huset  – cultural monument in Malmö

References

Swedish-language surnames